Hugo Cointard (born 18 September 1995) is a French professional footballer who plays as a goalkeeper for Lusitanos Saint-Maur.

Career
Cointard began his football career playing for his hometown club, Vendée Fontenay. He spent six years training at the club before joining professional club Nantes at the age of 14. He then joined Tours in 2011.

After six months without club, Cointard signed a contract with Chartres on 10 January 2018.

References

External links
 Soccerway Profile

Living people
1995 births
French footballers
French expatriate footballers
Association football goalkeepers
Vendée Fontenay Foot players
FC Nantes players
Tours FC players
Les Herbiers VF players
FC Chartres players
FC Strumska Slava Radomir players
FC Botev Vratsa players
AS Béziers (2007) players
US Lusitanos Saint-Maur players
Championnat National players
First Professional Football League (Bulgaria) players
French expatriate sportspeople in Bulgaria
Expatriate footballers in Bulgaria